Eve Golden is a biographer whose work focuses on American silent film, theater and early twentieth century actresses. She was born and raised near Philadelphia, Pennsylvania.

Bibliography
Eve Golden is the author of seven theater and film biographies.

 Platinum Girl: The Life and Legends of Jean Harlow (1991)
 Vamp: The Rise and Fall of Theda Bara (1997)
 Golden Images: 41 Essays on Silent Film Stars (1998)
 Anna Held and the Birth of Ziegfeld's Broadway (2000)
 The Brief, Madcap Life of Kay Kendall (2002)
 Vernon and Irene Castle's Ragtime Revolution (2007)
 Bride of Golden Images: Essays on Stars of the 1930s-60s (2009)
 John Gilbert: The Last of the Silent Film Stars (2013)
 Jayne Mansfield: The Girl Couldn't Help It (2021)

References

 Anna Held and the Birth of Ziegfeld's Broadway (review by Ray Miller Theatre Journal, 57, no. 2 (2005): 337–338)

External links
 Eve Golden official web site.

American biographers
Year of birth missing (living people)
Living people
American film historians